Boesmans River may refer to any of the following rivers in South Africa:

Boesmans River (Eastern Cape) 
Boesmans River (Western Cape) 
Boesmans or Bushman's River, KwaZulu-Natal

See also
Boesmanspruit